Cedar Township is a township in Mitchell County, Iowa, USA.

History
Cedar Township was established in 1857.

References

Townships in Mitchell County, Iowa
Townships in Iowa
1857 establishments in Iowa
Populated places established in 1857